Rare may refer to:

 Rare, a particular temperature of meat
 Something infrequent or scarce, see Scarcity
 Rare species, a conservation category in biology designating the scarcity of an organism and implying a threat to its viability

Rare or RARE may also refer to:

Acronyms

Ram Air Rocket Engine, a U.S. Navy program of the 1950s
Ronne Antarctic Research Expedition

Music
 Rare (Northern Irish band), a 1990s trip hop group
 Rare (Serbian band), an alternative rock band

Albums
 Rare (Asia album), 1999
 Rare (David Bowie album), 1982
 Rare (Hundredth album), 2017
 Rare (Selena Gomez album) or the title song (see below), 2020
 Rare!, by Crack the Sky, 1994
 Rare, Vol. 1, by Ultravox, 1993
 Rare, Vol. 2, by Ultravox, 1994
 Rare: The Collected B-Sides 1989–1993, by Moby, 1996
 Rare, by Xiu Xiu, 2012

Songs
 "Rare" (Gwen Stefani song), 2016
 "Rare" (Selena Gomez song), 2020
 "Rare", by Man Overboard from Man Overboard, 2011

Organizations

 Rare (company), a British video game development studio
 Réseaux Associés pour la Recherche Européenne, a computer networking organisation known since 1994 as TERENA
 Rare (conservation organization), an environmentalist group
 Rare (news website), a U.S.-based website

People 

 Vanessa Rare, New Zealand film and television actress, film screenwriter and director

See also
Rarity (disambiguation)
Rarities (disambiguation)